
Gmina Białobrzegi is a rural gmina (administrative district) in Łańcut County, Subcarpathian Voivodeship, in south-eastern Poland.

Villages
Gmina Białobrzegi contains the villages and settlements of Białobrzegi, Budy Łańcuckie, Dębina, Korniaktów Północny, Korniaktów Południowy and Wola Dalsza.

Neighbouring gminas
Gmina Białobrzegi is bordered by the gminas of Czarna, Grodzisko Dolne, Łańcut, Przeworsk, Tryńcza and Żołynia.

References

Polish official population figures 2006

Bialobrzegi
Łańcut County